Kedrostis africana (or baboon's cucumber) is a species of flowering plant in the family Cucurbitaceae. It is native to Namibia and South Africa. It has gained the Royal Horticultural Society's Award of Garden Merit as an ornamental.

Description 
It is a succulent monoecious plant. It has a large underground tuber, called a caudex which can span to lengths of up to 50 cm. This caudex is a store of water, which makes it resistant to droughts.

It is also climber with vines can grow between 1 – 6m in length. Its lobed leaves are between 6 – 10 cm long.

Baboon's cucumbers form short racemes consisting of 1–12 male flowers. Their petals are light cream to green-yellow coloured. Female flowers are not grouped like male flowers and are also light cream to green-yellow. They bloom during the summer.

They also bear orange fruit, with a diameter between 8 – 15mm.

Cultivation 
This species can be propagated with seeds or cuttings. Because they can produce separate male and female flowers on the same plant, they are self-fertile. This also allows their orange fruit to readily show. They also grow very slowly.

This plant should be protected from drought, frost and excessive sunlight. Baboon's cucumbers should be grown in well-drained soil, with lots of water during the growing season. Providing with warmth and fertiliser during its active will also speed up its growth.

During the summer, water regularly, but not during autumn or winter as this could leave it vulnerable to rotting. It should also be kept above 0 °C.

Because it's a climber, the stems will need some support.

Uses

Traditional Medicine 
Kedrostis africana is used to induce vomiting, urination, the prevention of fluid retention. It is also used to treat syphilis. A decoction of the crushed bulb is taken to manage obesity.

References

Fauna of Namibia
Fauna of South Africa
Cucurbitoideae
Vines
Tubers
Succulent plants
Caudiciform plants